Barrack Street Bridge is the second crossing of the Eastern Railway line at its location just north of the Barrack Street intersection with Wellington Street at the eastern end of the Perth Railway Station yard in Perth, Western Australia. Despite its name the bridge carries Beaufort Street, although it has been called Beaufort Street Bridge.

The development of the Eastern Railway through Perth created a large yard and railway station area that separated the Perth central business district (CBD) from its adjacent northern streets. The first railway bridge at Barrack Street was timber, and in repair on a regular basis. It was demolished in 1894.

Current bridge

The current bridge, built in 19071908, was a dominant feature countered by the Horseshoe Bridge at the western end of the railway station.  Parts of the construction included Donnybrook stone and Meckering granite.

It was also a location for paintings and photographs of the Perth railway station over time.

It lost its dominance in the landscape with the construction of the multi story car park adjacent to the west, in the late 20th century. Significant parts of the original railings were truncated by changes of the adjacent streets, but the lamps and fittings have been retained on the shortened sections.

Notes

References

Bridges completed in 1908
Road bridges in Perth, Western Australia
Barrack Street, Perth
Beaufort Street, Perth
1908 establishments in Australia